The list of World Rally Championship rallies includes all rally competitions that have been part of the FIA World Rally Championship (WRC) schedule. It does not include rallies that were only part of the FIA Cup for Drivers, the predecessor to the drivers' world championship, such as the Arctic Rally, the Scottish Rally and the Southern Cross Rally. 

The list includes only the rallies that have been finally taken place and not those that had been cancelled.

From 1994 to 1996, the World Rally Championship had an event rotation system. The Swedish Rally did not have full WRC status in the 1994 season, the Rally Finland in 1995, and the Monte Carlo Rally and the RAC Rally in 1996. Instead, these rallies were part of the 2-litre "Formula 2" championship that was contested from 1993 to 1999.

The World Rally Championship had a new "Round Rotation" System in 2009 and 2010 in order to attract candidate rallies to have a chance to be a WRC event.

After the second rotation system, World Rally Championship had a calendar with 13 rallies until 2019, with some changes such as Rally of Poland replacing Acropolis Rally of Greece in 2014, and Rally Turkey replacing Rally of Poland in 2018. Hopes for a calendar consisted of 14 rounds again were diminished due to the cancelation of 2016 Rally China and 2019 Rally Australia.

In 2020 and 2021 the World Rally Championship was largely affected by the COVID-19 pandemic, resulting in many rallies being canceled, mostly outside Europe, and new European rounds entering the calendar, such as Rally Estonia, Rally Monza, Croatia Rally and Ypres Rally Belgium.

Rallies by location
Note: bold text indicates  rallies.

Rallies by season

1973–1979

1980–1989

1990–1999

2000–2009

2010–2019

2020–present

Evolution of the calendar

Notes

References

 
Rallies